Athol Stanley Mortimer Tymms (21 February 1886 – 21 November 1949) was an Australian rules footballer in the Victorian Football League (VFL).

Family
The third son, and the eighth of the eleven children of English-born jeweller, Robert Joseph Tymms (1847–1930), and Canadian-born Anna Augusta Tymms (1849-1938), née Magee, Athol Stanley Mortimer Tymms was born at Essendon, Victoria on 21 February 1886.

Marriages
He married his first wife, Ethel Mary Ragg (1878-1936), at Sydney, on 17 December 1915; they had one child: Robert Dunlop Tymms (b. 30 May 1922).

He married his second wife, Alison Atkins Fletcher (1904-1998), at Deniliquin, New South Wales in 1937; they had two children: the twins, Athol Mortimer Tymms, and John Mortimer Tymms, both born on 1 August 1938.

Education
Having been educated at Melbourne Grammar School from 1901 to 1904  where he excelled as both an athlete and a footballer  Tymms went on to study medicine at the University of Melbourne.
 In 1910, he shared the prestigious Beaney Scholarship for Surgery with his fellow Old Melburnian, University Football Club team-mate, and fellow medical student, Edward Cordner.
 He was scheduled to graduate Bachelor of Medicine (MB) on 23 December 1910; however, he did not attend the graduation ceremony.
 He graduated Bachelor of Medicine and Bachelor of Surgery (MBBS) on 2 March 1911.
 He graduated Doctor of Medicine (MD) on 5 April 1913.
 He graduated Master of Surgery (MS) on 8 April 1916.

Football

Essendon (VFL)
Born in Essendon, he debuted with the Essendon Football Club in 1905, and played in three senior games.

University (VFL)
After two seasons absence, he returned to the VFL with the University in 1908, the club's first season in the VFL competition, going on to play 60 games with University over six seasons (1908-1913).

Medical career
After the 1913 season Tymms retired to focus on his career as a medical practitioner, and concentrate on his studies to become a specialist surgeon.

Death
He died at his home in Armadale on 2 November 1949 at the age of 63.

Notes

References
 Holmesby, Russell & Main, Jim (2002), The Encyclopedia of AFL Footballers: Every AFL/VFL player since 1897 (4th ed.), Melbourne, Victoria: Crown Content. 
 Maplestone, M., Flying Higher: History of the Essendon Football Club 1872–1996, Essendon Football Club, (Melbourne), 1996.

External links

 
Essendon Football Club profile

1886 births
1949 deaths
People educated at Melbourne Grammar School
Australian rules footballers from Melbourne
Essendon Football Club players
University Football Club players
20th-century Australian medical doctors
Medical doctors from Melbourne
Australian surgeons
People from Essendon, Victoria